Clive William Barker (born 23 June 1944) is a South African former football coach. He guided the South African national team to their only African Nations Cup title in 1996. He is uncle of Steve Barker.

Career

Player
Barker was born in Durban, KwaZulu-Natal. He became a professional footballer in the 1960s, playing for Durban City and Durban United having made his debut at the age of 17. He had a trial with Leicester City, but a serious knee injury quickly ended his career.

Manager
"The Dog", as he is nicknamed, became a manager in the 1970s,  coaching numerous clubs in South Africa, including Durban City, Manning Rangers, AmaZulu (Zulu Royals) and Santos Cape Town.

During his club career he won two league championships and two league cups. He was one of the first white managers in the South African league.

He took over as manager of the South Africa national football team in 1994 after the team was reinstated after a ban due to apartheid. He took the South African national team to their only African Nations Cup title in 1996, with a 2–0 victory in the final against Tunisia. Under his guidance South Africa qualified for their first ever World Cup in 1998 in France. He quit in December 1997, before the team could compete in the World Cup finals, after a poor showing at the 1997 FIFA Confederations Cup.

Barker was a local television commentator during the 2010 World Cup.

Barker was appointed manager of Bidvest Wits in January 2013.

References

1944 births
Living people
Soccer players from Durban
White South African people
South African soccer players
Association football defenders
South African soccer managers
South African people of English descent
South Africa national soccer team managers
1997 FIFA Confederations Cup managers
AmaZulu F.C. managers
Durban City F.C. managers
Santos F.C. (South Africa) managers
Maritzburg United F.C. managers
1996 African Cup of Nations managers